A Lei e o Crime (Portuguese for The Law and the Crime) is a Brazilian serial dramatic television series, created by Marcílio Moraes, produced and broadcast by Rede Record, which premiered on January 9, 2009.
The series revolves around a low-class worker turned into drugdealer and a noble-blood woman turned into a police captain, who seeks for justice and revenge of her father's death.

It is directed by Alexandre Avancini and written by Marcílio Moraes, Joaquim Assis, René Belmonte, Leonardo Gudel, Sylvia Palma, Eduardo Quental and Irene Bosísio.

Since its premiere, A Lei e o Crime has achieved unexpectedly high audience ratings, with a 20-point average in São Paulo, and constantly leading the ratings in Rio de Janeiro, taking off rival Rede Globo's usual number-one spot.

Cast
Francisca Queiroz - Catarina Laclos
Ângelo Paes Leme - Nando "Nandinho da Bazuca"
Raquel Nunes - Olímpia
Heitor Martinez - Leandro
Caio Junqueira - Romero
Gabriela Durlo - Rosa
Valquíria Ribeiro - Maria Joana
Rogério Britto - Araújo
Aline Borges - Gislaine "Lacraia"
André Ramiro - Tião Meleca
Sílvio Guindane - Valdo
Felipe Martins - André
Daniel Andrade - Orlando
Adriana Prado - Josefa
Juliana Teixeira - Margarida
Eduardo Lago - Renato
Tião D'Ávila
Kito Junqueira - Ari
Chico Expedito - Cícero
Luiz Carlos de Moraes - Izaque
Cristina Pereira - Jussara
Léa Garcia - Clara
Marília Barbosa - Luísa
Rodrigo Costa - Celso
Giullia Buscaio - Patrícia
Larissa Henrique - Sandrinha
Marcílio Moraes - escritor
Roberto Frota - Reinaldo
Nildo Parente - Alcebíades de Souza
Jonas Bloch - Dep. Feitosa
Cláudio Gabriel - Anderson
Marcelo Escorel - Juvenal
Marcela Moura - Laura
Sérgio Henrique - Chulé
Paulo Carvalho - Belisário
Jonathan Nogueira - Edson
Natália Guimarães - Gisele
Vanessa Gerbelli

RecordTV original programming
2009 Brazilian television series debuts
2009 Brazilian television series endings
Brazilian drama television series
Portuguese-language television shows
Works about organized crime in Brazil